Tsehay is an Ethiopian feminine given name. Notable people with the name include:
Tsehay Hawkins (born 2005), Australian dancer and singer
Tsehay Melaku (born c. 1952), Ethiopan writer
Tsehay Gemechu (born 1998), Ethiopian athlete

Feminine given names
Ethiopian given names